is a Japanese Canadian cell biologist. Masui retired  in 1997 and has since held the position of Professor Emeritus at the University of Toronto.

Education
Masui studied biology at Kyoto University, graduating with his Bachelor of Science degree in zoology in 1953, his Master of Science in 1955 and his Ph.D. in 1961.

Career and research
While still studying at Kyoto University, he taught biology, first as a teacher's assistant and then as a teacher, at Konan University, where he was promoted to Assistant Professor after his earning his Ph.D. In 1966, he moved to Yale University to join Clement L. Markert's lab, and in 1969 to the University of Toronto, where he taught as Associate Professor in the Department of Zoology.

Recognition
In 1998, he won the Albert Lasker Award for Basic Medical Research with Lee Hartwell and Paul Nurse for their pioneering work on cell division. He was elected a Fellow of the Royal Society (FRS) in 1998 and an officer of the Order of Canada in 2003 in recognition of his life's work. in  1992 he was awarded the Gairdner Foundation International Award.

References

1931 births
Living people
Japanese biologists
Recipients of the Albert Lasker Award for Basic Medical Research
Fellows of the Royal Society
Kyoto University alumni
Officers of the Order of Canada
Canadian people of Japanese descent
Academic staff of Konan University